1st Place is an album led by trombonist Jimmy Knepper which was recorded in 1982 and originally released on the BlackHawk label in 1986.

Reception 

The Allmusic review by Scott Yanow states "Trombonist Jimmy Knepper is well featured on this out of print LP from the defunct Black Hawk label, both as a highly original trombonist and as a composer".

Track listing 
All compositions by Jimmy Knepper.
 "Leave of Absinthe" – 6:55
 "Awesome" – 6:44
 "Distress Dismay" – 8:28
 "Fallen Crest" – 8:20
 "When I See You" – 6:48
 "Idol of the Flies" – 8:00

Personnel 
Jimmy Knepper – trombone
Bruce Forman – guitar
Mike Richmond – bass
Billy Hart – drums

References 

Jimmy Knepper albums
1986 albums
BlackHawk Records albums
Albums recorded at Van Gelder Studio